Sandra Brown (born 1 April 1949) is a British ultra distance walker / runner who holds a number of world records in the field of long-distance walking.

Career 

After a childhood which included many, duly completed her first formal marathon in 1982 in Winchester, at age 33 years. That same year saw her enter her first 'ultra' (a race of a distance beyond the marathon's 26 miles 385 yards) with the 100 km Surrey Summits in April and a Long Distance Walkers Association (LDWA) crosscountry 100 mile event alongs than 24 hours) in the annual English Centurions 24 Hour race - 32 "hundreds" walked between 1982 and 2018.

Brown has excelled in both ultradistance running and walking modes and has shown a great interest in the extremely long ultra distance events.

In 1989, Brown completed the first of four Paris-Colmar walks, a distance of 221 km between the two French cities.

In 1995 Brown walked from Land's End to John o' Groats (the walk from one end of Great Britain to the other), a distance of 830 miles. Her time of 13 days 10 hours beat the current running record and was to last for 9 years until, in 2006, it was finally beaten by world famous ultra distance runner Sharon Gaytor who ran the distance in 12 days 16 hours.

In Nanango (Queensland, Australia) in 1996, Brown set Women's World running records for 1000 kilometres (8 days 12 hours 16 mins 20 secs) and 1000 miles (14 days 10 hours 27 mins 20 secs). And as with her Land's End to John O'Groats record, she did it walking nearly the whole way. Even now, over 20 years later, these performances stand as the second and third ranking performances of all time behind the great Eleanor Robinson.

Brown has represented England on a number of occasions in ultra distance championships including the 2007 IAU 24 Hour Championship in Canada and the inaugural Commonwealth 24 Hour Run Championship in 2009 in England.

Records 

Brown holds the official World Walking Records (track) for the 100 km, 100 miles, 12 hours and 24 hours.

Centurion Badges 

The aim for many ultradistance walkers is to become a Centurion (racewalking), a membership reserved for those who can walk 100 miles (160.934 kilometres) within 24 hours. Brown is the only person in the world to be awarded all 7 Centurion medals (English, Continental, Australian, New Zealand, American, Malaysian and African).

Biographies 

The Winning Experience: Winning in Sport, in Business, in Life
By Richard Brown, 1996, 

Long At The Top: Richard and Sandra Brown 1982–1993
By Dudley Harris, 1994, self published (New Zealand)

Bluestocking in Black Tights
By Dudley Harris, 2000, self published (New Zealand)

References

1949 births
Living people
English female long-distance runners